Franz Schubert (1797–1828) was an Austrian composer.

Schubert or Franz Schubert may also refer to:
Schubert (surname)
Schubert (lunar crater)
Schubert (Mercurian crater)
3917 Franz Schubert, an asteroid
Electoral district of Schubert, a state electoral district in South Australia 
Schubert, Missouri, a community in the United States
Schubert calculus, a branch of algebraic geometry
"Franz Schubert", a 1977 song by Kraftwerk from Trans-Europe Express

People with the given name
Keith Glen Schubert, American drag queen known as Tammie Brown
Schubert Gambetta, Uruguayan association football player

See also 
 Boris Choubert
 Schubart (disambiguation)
Schubert Dip, a 1991 album by EMF
 Shubert (disambiguation)